Ian Scott (born 20 September 1967) is a former footballer who played in the Football League for Bury, Crewe Alexandra, Manchester City and Stoke City.

Career
Born in Manchester, Scott started his career with his local club Manchester City after progressing through the youth ranks at Maine Road. He spent two years in the Manchester City first team before joining Stoke City in 1989. His first season with Stoke was a poor one as the club were relegated to the Third Division. He spent the 1990–91 season in the club's reserves and also went out on loan to Crewe Alexandra. And after failing to establish himself in the squad in the 1991–92 season, Scott left Stoke in 1992 and joined Bury. He spent the 1992–93 season at Gigg Lane making twelve appearances scoring twice.

He also made two appearances for Mossley in 1992 on loan from Bury.

Career statistics
Source:

A.  The "Other" column constitutes appearances and goals in the Football League Trophy and Full Members Cup.

References

English footballers
Stoke City F.C. players
Manchester City F.C. players
Crewe Alexandra F.C. players
Bury F.C. players
English Football League players
1967 births
Living people
Association football midfielders
Mossley A.F.C. players